Nedaye Iranian Party (Hezb-e Nuday-e 'Iranian) —NEDA is the official acronym standing for 'Second Generation of Reforms'— is a reformist political party in Iran with social democratic leanings that held its first congress in 2015.

It was the first party that emerged after the reformist crackdown during 2009 Iranian presidential election protests, followed by the Union of Islamic Iran People Party. 
The majority of members belong to the youth wing of banned Islamic Iran Participation Front and are in their early 30s.

The party was in coalition with the Pervasive Coalition of Reformists during 2016 Iranian legislative election.

Party leaders

References

External links
Official site

Political parties established in 2014
2014 establishments in Iran
Reformist political groups in Iran
Social democratic parties